Lumis is a surname. Notable people with the surname include:

 Dexter Lumis (born 1984), real name Samuel Shaw, American wrestler
 Harriet Randall Lumis (1870–1953), American landscape painter
 Karo Lumis (born 1980), Papua New Guinean woman cricketer

See also
 Loomis (surname)